Bernhard Bagnoud (born 10 February 1932) was a Swiss ice hockey player who competed in the 1956 Winter Olympics.

In 1956, he participated with the Swiss ice hockey team in the Winter Olympics tournament.

See also
 List of Olympic men's ice hockey players for Switzerland

References

External links

1932 births
Living people
Ice hockey players at the 1956 Winter Olympics
Olympic ice hockey players of Switzerland
Swiss ice hockey forwards